The emblems of the constituent republics of the Union of Soviet Socialist Republics all featured predominantly the hammer and sickle and the red star that symbolised communism, as well as a rising sun (although in the case of the Latvian SSR, since the Baltic Sea is west of Latvia, it could be interpreted as a setting sun), surrounded by a wreath of wheat (except the Karelo-Finnish SSR with a wreath of rye). The USSR State motto, Workers of the world, unite!, in both the republic's language and Russian was also placed on each one of them. In addition to those repetitive motifs, emblems of many Soviet republics also included features that were characteristic of their local landscapes, economies or cultures. 

The emblems are often called coats of arms, but since they (deliberately) did not follow the rules of heraldry, most of them cannot be considered coats of arms. However, they all did follow the same basic pattern, a pattern which sometimes has led to the use of the term "socialist heraldry". 

The table below presents final versions of the renderings of the Soviet republics' emblems prior to the dissolution of the USSR in 1991, as well as the arms of two republics that ceased to exist before that time. For comparison, national arms of present-day successor states of the Soviet republics are also shown. As can be seen, most Asian post-Soviet republics use arms based on or reminiscent of the Soviet-era emblems. Most European republics, on the other hand, reverted to their traditional pre-Soviet heraldic arms. Belarus used the traditional Pahonia as its coat of arms from 1991 to 1995 when it was replaced by a new emblem closely resembling the Soviet-era design. Additionally, the secessionist Pridnestrovian Moldavian Republic (Transnistria), internationally recognised as part of Moldova, uses an emblem based on the emblem of the Moldavian SSR (see Coat of arms of Transnistria) and the self-proclaimed Luhansk People's Republic, controlling part of the Luhansk Oblast in Ukraine, created the similar emblem.

Emblems of the Soviet Republics

Other emblems of the post-Soviet territories

Current independent territories

Former independent territories

References

See also

 Communist symbolism
 State Emblem of the Soviet Union
 Flags of the Soviet Republics
 Coats of arms of the Yugoslav Socialist Republics
 List of coats of arms of the Russian Federation

Soviet Republics
Soviet Union

Soviet Republics
Soviet Republics
Soviet Republics
Soviet Republics